Charles Moore Bowden (1886 – 10 July 1972) was a New Zealand politician of the National Party.

Biography

Early life and career
Bowden was born in Dunedin in 1886. He received his education at Auckland Grammar School. After school, he was briefly with an auctioneering firm before joining Kempthorne Prosser. When his family moved to Wellington, he joined W.M. Bannatyne and Co, where he moved into accounting. He became self-employed and established the accountancy firm Bowden, Bass and Cox in 1923. In the same year, he was president of the New Zealand Society of Accountants, and afterwards president of the Wellington branch of the Chamber of Commerce (1924–1925). For almost a decade, he was chairman and managing director of Wairarapa Farmers in Masterton (1927–1936), and he was a director of Bannatyne and Co.

Political career

In 1941 Bowden was elected to the Wellington City Council serving one term.

Bowden was a cabinet minister in the First National Government. He was Minister of Customs (1949–1954), Minister of Industries and Commerce (1949–1950), and Minister of Stamp Duties (1949–1952). In 1953, he was awarded the Queen Elizabeth II Coronation Medal. In 1955, Bowden was granted the use of the title of "Honourable" for life, having served more than three years as a member of the Executive Council.

Later life and death
In May 1955 he was appointed chairman of the Ross Sea Committee to organise New Zealand participation in the Commonwealth Trans-Antarctic Expedition. Bowden Glacier lying on the southeast flank of Salient Ridge that flows northeast to Blue Glacier, Victoria Land, was named by the New Zealand Geographic Board in 1994 for Bowden during Sir Edmund Hillary's South Pole Expedition, part of the Commonwealth Trans-Antarctic Expedition in 1957.

He was appointed director of the Bank of New Zealand and chairman of Heritage New Zealand.

Bowden died on 10 July 1972.

Notes

References

|-

1886 births
1972 deaths
New Zealand National Party MPs
Members of the Cabinet of New Zealand
Members of the New Zealand House of Representatives
New Zealand MPs for Wellington electorates
Politicians from Dunedin
People educated at Auckland Grammar School
Wellington City Councillors